Steffi Graf defeated Arantxa Sánchez Vicario in the final, 6–0, 6–2 to win the women's singles tennis title at the 1994 Australian Open. With the win, she achieved a non-calendar-year Grand Slam, dubbed the 'Steffi Slam'. This was the second time in Graf's career where she won four consecutive majors, after achieving the Grand Slam in 1988. Graf did not lose a set en route to the title.

Monica Seles was the three-time reigning champion, but did not participate due to her stabbing in April 1993.

Seeds

Qualifying

Draw

Finals

Top half

Section 1

Section 2

Section 3

Section 4

Bottom half

Section 5

Section 6

Section 7

Section 8

External links
 1994 Australian Open – Women's draws and results at the International Tennis Federation

Women's singles
Australian Open (tennis) by year – Women's singles
1994 in Australian women's sport